Charge It 2 da Game is the second studio album by American rapper Silkk the Shocker, released February 17, 1998 as planned, on No Limit Records in the United States. The album was later certified Platinum by the RIAA on March 25, 1998
  
Charge It 2 Da Game debuted at #3 on the U.S. Billboard 200 and #1 on the Top R&B/Hip-Hop Albums selling 245,000 copies in its 1st week.

Music 
The album features guests 8Ball (rapper), Destiny's Child, Mystikal, Snoop Dogg, Mia X, C-Murder and Master P. 
The entire album was produced by Beats By the Pound.

Reception
It was certified Platinum by the RIAA on March 25, 1998.
Two charting singles were released from the album, "Just Be Straight with Me" (featuring Master P and Destiny's Child), and "It Ain't My Fault" (featuring Mystikal).

Track listing

Personnel
Pen & Pixel - Cover art

Charts

Weekly charts

Year-end charts

See also
 List of number-one R&B albums of 1998 (U.S.)

References

1998 albums
Silkk the Shocker albums
No Limit Records albums
Priority Records albums
Gangsta rap albums by American artists